V – Part Three of L.O.V.E is the third EP in Sofia Talvik's four album saga, and was released 2011. Along with three new songs, the album includes a new performance of Jonestown, the title song from her earlier album, Jonestown. Produced by Talvik's bass player, Janne Manninen, the EP contains an "electronica pop" feel, utilizing synthesizers more than previous projects.

Track listing

References

2011 EPs
Sofia Talvik albums